Paxtaobod (also spelled as Pakhta-abad) is a city in Andijan Region, Uzbekistan. It is the administrative center of Paxtaobod District. Its population was 18,991 in 1989, 23,200 in 2003, and 34,400 in 2016.

References

Populated places in Andijan Region
Cities in Uzbekistan